This is a list of Fordham Rams in the NFL Draft. In total the Rams have had 29 players in the NFL Draft.

Key

Selections 

Note: Kurt Sohn attended Fordham but not for 4 years. Sohn was a WR for the NY Jets from 1981 to 1988.

References

Fordham

Fordham Rams
Fordham Rams NFL Draft